Daniel X: Demons and Druids is the third installment of the Daniel X series of books, written by James Patterson and Adam Sadler.

Plot 
Daniel X's hunt for aliens and to eliminate each and every intergalactic criminal on Earth is always relentless, but this time, it is getting personal. Number Three on the List of Alien Outlaws takes the form of raging, soul-possessing fire. The fire transports Daniel back to the most traumatic event of his life: the death of his parents. In the face of this weakness, Daniel struggles with his extraordinary powers like never before, and more than ever is at stake: his best friends are in grave peril. The only way to save them is to travel back through a hole in time to the demon's arrival during the Dark Ages. In the Dark Ages, he also meets a new friend.

References

External links

2010 American novels
2010 science fiction novels
Doubleday (publisher) books
Collaborative novels